P. Yerragonda is a village in Y. Ramavaram Mandal, East Godavari district in the state of Andhra Pradesh in India.

Demographics 
 India census, This Village had a population of 1244, out of which 245 were male and 999 were female. Population of children below 6 years of age were 4%. The literacy rate of the village is 85%.

References 

Villages in Y. Ramavaram mandal